Departures is a collection of alternate history stories by Harry Turtledove, first published in paperback by Del Rey Books in June 1993 and reprinted in October 1998; an ebook edition followed from the same publisher in May 2011. The first British edition was published in ebook form by Gateway/Orion in July 2013.

The book contains twenty short short stories and novelettes by the author, some originally published under his early pseudonym Eric G. Iverson, together with an introductory author's note. The first edition also includes a short piece about the author and an excerpt from his then-recent novel The Guns of the South.

"In the Presence of Mine Enemies" was later expanded into a full-length novel in 2003.

Short stories
"Author's Note"
"Counting Potsherds"
"Death in Vesunna" (with Elaine O'Byrne)
"Departures" (prequel to Agent of Byzantium)
"Islands in the Sea"
"Not All Wolves"
"Clash of Arms"
"Pillar of Cloud, Pillar of Fire" (part of Agent of Byzantium series)
"Report of the Special Committee on the Quality of Life"
"Batboy"
"The Last Reunion"
"Designated Hitter"
"Gladly Wolde He Lerne"
"The Barbecue, the Movie, and Other Unfortunately Not So Relevant Material"
"In the Presence of Mine Enemies"
"The R Strain"
"Lure"
"Secret Names"
"Les Mortes D'Arthur"
"Last Favour"
"Nasty, Brutish, and..."

Recognition
The collection placed thirteenth in the 1994 Locus Poll Award for Best Collection.

References

1993 short story collections
Short story collections by Harry Turtledove
Science fiction short story collections
Del Rey books
Alternate history short stories